Harold "Doc" West (August 12, 1915 – May 4, 1951) was an American jazz drummer.

Early life 
West was born in Wolford, North Dakota. He learned to play piano and cello as a child before switching to drums.

Career 
In the 1930s, West played in Chicago with Tiny Parham, Erskine Tate, and Roy Eldridge (1937–38). Late in the 1930s he filled in for Chick Webb when Webb was unable to lead his own orchestra. Early in the 1940s he played with Hot Lips Page, and played on the early bebop scene at Minton's Playhouse in New York City with Dizzy Gillespie, Charlie Parker, Tiny Grimes,  and Don Byas. He played with Oscar Pettiford in 1944 and stood in for Jo Jones occasionally in Count Basie's orchestra.

West appears on recordings from Slam Stewart, Leo Watson, Wardell Gray, Billie Holiday, Erroll Garner, Big Joe Turner, and Jay McShann.

Personal life 
West and his wife, Florence, had one daughter. He died in 1951 while on tour with Roy Eldridge.

References

1915 births
1951 deaths
People from Pierce County, North Dakota
American jazz drummers
Musicians from North Dakota
20th-century American drummers
American male drummers
20th-century American male musicians
American male jazz musicians